The Riga Grand Prix was a one day cycling race held in Riga, Latvia. It was part of UCI Europe Tour in category 1.2 from 2006 to 2012 and was upgraded to 1.1 in 2013.

Winners

References

Cycle races in Latvia
Recurring sporting events established in 2006
Recurring sporting events disestablished in 2013
UCI Europe Tour races
Defunct cycling races in Latvia